{{Infobox film
| name           = The Fountain of Life
| image          = Masters of the Universe Fountain of Life logo.jpg
| image_size     =
| caption        = 
| director       = John F. Carroll Russell Minton
| writer         = Screenplay:John F. CarrollAdditional writing:Paul Dini
| producer       = John F. CarrollRussell Minton
| starring       = John F. CarrollBethany HarbaughDavid McCullars
| cinematography = Greg DeBlieuxRussell Minton
| editing        = John F. Carroll
| music          = Christopher Barr
| studio         = Weird City Films
| released       = 
| runtime        = 57 minutes
| country        = United States
| language       = English 
}}The Fountain of Life''' is a 2012 fantasy-adventure fan film based on Mattel's Masters of the Universe franchise and Last of the Mohicans by James Fenimore Cooper. The film was directed by John F. Carroll and Russell Minton during the winter and spring of 2012 around Austin, Texas and the Hesse, Germany.

The film is a direct sequel to The Wizard of Stone Mountain. The wizard Malik and his friends are on their way to the mythical Fountain of Life when they are ambushed by an army of Goblins. He-Man and the heroic warriors come to their aid only to fall into a much larger conflict. The film debuted at Grayskull Con 2012 in Germany in September 2012, followed by Screenings at Power-Con 2012 in Los Angeles and the Alamo Drafthouse in Austin, Texas. The film will be free to view online and will begin streaming in early 2013.

Plot
The evil Skeletor, still angry over losing Malik, The Wizard of Stone Mountain, as his bargaining chip to release a demon army from the dark dimension, devises a new plot to take over Eternia. With the aid of Evil-Lyn, Kothos and General Tataran, Skeletor tries to conquer the mythic Fountain of Life. Malik, He-Man and their friends must band together to defeat the evil warriors and prevent disaster.

Cast
John F. Carroll as Malik, General Tataran, The Faceless One, Hordak
Chris Romani as Evil-Lyn
David McCullars as He-Man
LeRoy Beck as Melaktha
Nick Orzech as Stanlan
Javier Smith as Keldor, Zodak
Bethany Harbaugh as Teela
Kevin Gouldthorpe as Stratos
Bridget Farias as Kareen
Richard Dodwell as Kyros
Joseph Fotinos as King Randor
Emily Hampton as Princess Adora, She-Ra
Blake Yelavich as Locus
Juli Dearrington as The Sorceress
Russell Minton as Kothos
Andrew Brett as Skeletor
Elisabeth Raine as Rayna
Ben Scott as Man-At-Arms
Taylor Basinger as Malik's Servant (Giaus)
Björn Korthof as Prince Adam
Johnny Bilson as Tri-Klops
John Atkin as General Blade
Lee Wilson as King Grayskull

Reception
As of December 2012, the film has only been in limited release. Audiences have not seen the final cut of the film, but many have responded favorably – especially enjoying seeing more Masters of the Universe characters, such as He-Man.

SequelsThe Fountain of Life is part of a trilogy that includes [[The Wizard of Stone Mountain, The Fountain of Life and The Trials of Darksmoke. The Fountain of Life'' is the second film in the series.

References

External links
 
 

Films shot in Austin, Texas
2012 films
2010s English-language films
Fan films
American independent films
American superhero films
2010s American films